The Twins Effect II is a 2004 Hong Kong action fantasy film directed by Corey Yuen and Patrick Leung. The film is a sequel to The Twins Effect (2003), but has a completely different story from the first film. It starred Charlene Choi and Gillian Chung of Cantopop duo Twins in the leading roles. Co-stars include Donnie Yen, Daniel Wu, Edison Chen, Wilson Chen, Tony Leung Ka-fai, Qu Ying, Fan Bingbing and Jim Chim. Jackie Chan also makes a cameo appearance, along with his son Jaycee Chan in his acting debut. The film's original English working title was The Huadu Chronicles: Blade of the Rose and its US DVD release title is Blade of Kings.

Plot
The film is set in Flower Capital, a land ruled by an evil queen (Qu Ying) who started hating men after her lover, High Priest Wei Liao (Daniel Wu), betrayed her. All men in the kingdom are slaves to women. However, a prophecy foretells that one day, the Star of Rex will find and wield a mythic sword, rise to power, overthrow the queen, and restore the balance of the two sexes.

At the start of the movie, Crouching Tiger Hidden Dragon (Donnie Yen), a master swordsman who has made it his quest to overthrow the queen's regime, has commissioned Peachy (Edison Chen) to steal for him a certain engraved stone from the queen's palace. Peachy is successful, but the queen's soldiers and spies pursue him.  Before the stone can be recaptured, it comes into the possession of Peachy's two friends Charcoal Head (Jaycee Chan) and Blockhead (Bolin Chen), who like Peachy earn a humble living by street-performing in a troupe led by their adoptive father, Blackwood.

The two set out to deliver the stone to Crouching Tiger Hidden Dragon, along the way discovering the stone is actually a map, which they assume will lead them to riches.  Before they can meet Crouching Tiger Hidden Dragon, they are intercepted by two lovely, but lethal, female warriors, Spring (Charlene Choi) and Blue Bird (Gillian Chung), each of whom is pursuing the pair for different reasons.  The four agree to follow the map together, eventually learning that the map leads to the mythic sword and that either Charcoal Head or Blockhead is the Star of Rex.  The journey takes them through dangerous terrain, culminating in an encounter with the Lord of Armour (Jackie Chan), who guards the way to the sword.

Even as the four make their way toward the sword, the queen is preparing for their destruction, using her army and her powerful magic.  A final battle will decide the fate of the land.

Cast
Donnie Yen as General Lone
Jaycee Chan as Charcoal Head / Star of Rex
Charlene Choi as Spring / 13th Master
Gillian Chung as Blue Bird
Bolin Chen as Blockhead
Tony Leung Ka-fai as Master Blackwood
Qu Ying as the Evil Queen
Fan Bingbing as Red Vulture
Jackie Chan as General Wai Shing / Lord of Armour (cameo appearance) 
Daniel Wu as High Priest Wei Liao (special appearance)
Edison Chen as Peachy (guest appearance)
Jim Chim as Palupa
Xie Jingjing as Marshall Edo Bowman
Steven Cheung as a slave
Kenny Kwan as a slave
Sam Chan as a slave
Kam Siu-wai as a slave
Mou Kit as a slave
Leung Yuet-wan as a slave buyer
Lee Nga as the palace guard commander

External links
The Twins Effect II official Hong Kong website

The Twins Effect II at the Hong Kong Movie Database

2004 films
2000s Cantonese-language films
2004 action films
2004 martial arts films
2004 fantasy films
Hong Kong action films
Hong Kong martial arts films
Hong Kong fantasy films
Martial arts fantasy films
Films directed by Corey Yuen
2000s Hong Kong films